The 1971 Wimbledon Championships was a tennis tournament that took place on the outdoor grass courts at the All England Lawn Tennis and Croquet Club in Wimbledon, London, United Kingdom. The tournament was held from Monday 21 June until Saturday 3 July 1971. It was the 85th staging of the Wimbledon Championships, and the third Grand Slam tennis event of 1971. John Newcombe and Evonne Goolagong won the singles titles.

Prize money
The total prize money for the 1971 championships was £37,790. The winner of the men's title earned £3,750 while the women's singles champion earned £1,800.

* per team

Champions

Seniors

Men's singles

 John Newcombe defeated  Stan Smith, 6–3, 5–7, 2–6, 6–4, 6–4 
It was Newcombe's 4th career Grand Slam title (his 2nd in the Open Era), and his 3rd (and last) Wimbledon title.

Women's singles

 Evonne Goolagong defeated  Margaret Court, 6–4, 6–1 
It was Goolagong's 2nd career Grand Slam title, and her 1st Wimbledon title.

Men's doubles

'Roy Emerson /  Rod Laver defeated  Arthur Ashe /  Dennis Ralston, 4–6, 9–7, 6–8, 6–4, 6–4

Women's doubles

 Rosie Casals /  Billie Jean King defeated  Margaret Court /  Evonne Goolagong, 6–3, 6–2

Mixed doubles

 Owen Davidson /  Billie Jean King defeated  Marty Riessen /  Margaret Court, 3–6, 6–2, 15–13

Juniors

Boys' singles

 Robert Kreiss defeated  Stephen Warboys, 2–6, 6–4, 6–3

Girls' singles

 Marina Kroschina defeated  Sue Minford, 6–4, 6–4

Singles seeds

Men's singles
  Rod Laver (quarterfinals, lost to Tom Gorman)
  John Newcombe (champion)
  Ken Rosewall (semifinals, lost to John Newcombe)
  Stan Smith (final, lost to John Newcombe)
  Arthur Ashe (third round, lost to Marty Riessen)
  Cliff Richey (quarterfinals, lost to Ken Rosewall)
  Ilie Năstase (second round, lost to Georges Goven)
  Cliff Drysdale (first round, lost to Tom Gorman)

Women's singles
  Margaret Court (final, lost to Evonne Goolagong)
  Billie Jean King (semifinals, lost to Evonne Goolagong)
  Evonne Goolagong (champion)
  Rosie Casals (second round, lost to Kerry Melville)
  Virginia Wade (fourth round, lost to Judy Dalton)
  Nancy Richey (quarterfinals, lost to Evonne Goolagong)
  Françoise Dürr (quarterfinals, lost to Billie Jean King)
  Helga Masthoff (third round, lost to Lesley Bowrey)

References

External links
 Official Wimbledon Championships website

 
Wimbledon Championships
Wimbledon Championships
Wimbledon Championships
Wimbledon Championships